Hypogymnia wilfiana is a species of foliose lichen in the family Parmeliaceae. It is found in western North America, where it grows on conifer trees.

Taxonomy

Hypogymnia wilfiana was formally described as a new species in 2010 by lichenologists Trevor Goward, Toby Spribille, and Teuvo Ahti. Here it was found growing on a branch of Pseudotsuga. The specific epithet honours Canadian bryologist Wilfred Borden Schofield (1927–2008).

Description
The lichen has three typical growth forms: appressed, imbricate, and swollen; the first two forms are most common at lower elevations. Hypogymnia wilfiana contains the secondary compound 2-methylene-3-carboxy-18-hydroxynonadecanoic acid ("apinnatic acid"), recorded for the first time from the genus Hypogymnia. Other compounds present in the lichen are atranorin (upper cortex), physodic acid, and di-O-methylphysodic acid.

Habitat and distribution
The distribution of Hypogymnia wilfiana spans from the Yukon south to Oregon and western Montana and extends to western Alberta in Canada. It occurs in inland, mostly intermontane regions. In the Pacific Coast area, it occurrence is mainly limited to the upper crowns of old trees. It is usually found on conifers, particularly Pseudotsuga, Abies, Picea, and Tsuga.

References

wilfiana
Lichen species
Lichens described in 2010
Lichens of Western Canada
Lichens of the United States
Taxa named by Teuvo Ahti
Taxa named by Toby Spribille
Fungi without expected TNC conservation status
Lichens of Subarctic America